Yeah may refer to:

 Yeah is a synonym of yes; see yes and no

Music

Albums
 Yeah!!!, by Aretha Franklin in 1965
 Yeah! (Brownsville Station album), 1973
 Yeah! (Charlie Rouse album), 1961 
 Yeah! (Def Leppard album), 2006 
 Yeah (Park Jung-ah album), 2006
 Yeah (The Wannadies album), 1999
 Yeah Yeah Yeah (compilation), 1999 compilation of 1960s garage rock
 Yeah!, KMFDM EP, 2017

Songs
 "Yeah" (Joe Nichols song), 2014
 "Yeah" (LCD Soundsystem song), 2004
 "Yeah!" (Paul Brandt song), 1998
 "Yeah!" (Usher song), 2004
 "Yeah 3x", by Chris Brown, 2010
 "Yeah", by Apink from Snow Pink
 "Yeah", by DJ Krush from Strictly Turntablized
 "Yeah!", by Does It Offend You Yeah? from Don't Say We Didn't Warn You
 "Yeah", by Kelly Clarkson from My December
 "Yeah", by Kyuss from Blues for the Red Sun
 "Yeah", by Queen from Made in Heaven
 "Yeah", by Royce da 5'9" from Independent's Day
 "Yeah", by Seether from Holding Onto Strings Better Left to Fray
 "Yeah", by Yolanda Adams from Mountain High... Valley Low
 "Yeah!", by Zwan from Mary Star of the Sea

See also
 Young European Alliance for Hope, the youth wing of the European Alliance for Freedom; see Vlaams Belang Jongeren
 YeAH-TCP, a TCP congestion-avoidance algorithm in computing
 Yeah Yeah (disambiguation)
 Yeah Yeah Yeah (disambiguation)
 Yeah! Woo!, a frequently sampled phrase by James Brown
 Yea (disambiguation)
 Yes (disambiguation)